Stenolechiodes macrolepiellus is a moth of the family Gelechiidae. It is found on Rhodes.

The larvae feed on Quercus macrolepis.

References

Moths described in 1999
Litini